Pietermaritzburg Commando was a light infantry regiment of the South African Army. It formed part of the South African Army Infantry Formation as well as the South African Territorial Reserve.

History

Origin
This unit could trace its origins back to a Natal Law for the protection of the colony, namely Law No 19 of 1862 which instructed the establishment of a rifle association.

Operations

With the UDF
The name of this rifle association was changed during the UDF era to the Pietermaritzburg Commando. 

By the 1940s, the commando was headquartered at the Pietermaritzburg Drill Hall and was shared by another unit during that era, namely the Natal Carbineers.

With the SADF

From Commando to Regiment
In 1981, the commando was converted to a regiment as an infantry battalion under the Citizen Force, being renamed as the Natalia Regiment.

With the SANDF

Commando System Disbandment
This unit, along with all other Commando units was disbanded after a decision by South African President Thabo Mbeki to disband all Commando Units. The Commando system was phased out between 2003 and 2008 "because of the role it played in the apartheid era", according to the Minister of Safety and Security Charles Nqakula.

Leadership

References

See also 
 South African Commando System

Infantry regiments of South Africa
South African Commando Units